Dale Steyn, a South African cricketer, has taken 29 five-wicket hauls in international cricket. In cricket, a five-wicket haul (also known as a "five–for" or "fifer") refers to a bowler taking five or more wickets in a single innings. This is regarded as a notable achievement, and only 42 bowlers have taken at least 15 five-wicket hauls at international level in their cricketing careers. A right-arm fast bowler, Steyn reached 300 Test wickets in fewer matches than any other South African bowler. He was named the ICC's Test Player of the Year in 2008, and the Wisden Cricketers' Almanack named him one of their cricketers of the year in 2013.

Steyn made his Test debut in 2004 against England at the St George's Oval, Port Elizabeth. His first Test five-wicket haul came in 2006, against New Zealand at the SuperSport Park, Centurion. In November 2007 against the same team at the Wanderers Stadium, Johannesburg, he took a five-wicket haul in both innings of a Test match for the first time. He has repeated this feat twice more: against Australia at the Melbourne Cricket Ground in 2008, and Pakistan at the Wanderers Stadium in 2013. Steyn's career-best figures for an innings are 7 wickets for 51 runs against India at the Vidarbha Cricket Association Stadium, Nagpur, in February 2010. He has taken ten or more wickets in a match on five occasions. As of 2015, he has taken the most number five-wicket hauls for South Africa.

Steyn made his One Day International (ODI) debut for the African XI in the first match of the 2005 Afro-Asia Cup, against the Asian XI at the SuperSport Park, Centurion. His first ODI five-wicket haul came during the 2011 Cricket World Cup, against India, a match which South Africa won at the Vidarbha Cricket Association Stadium. His career-best bowling in ODI cricket is 6 wickets for 39 runs against Pakistan at the St George's Park, Port Elizabeth, in November 2013.

Making his first Twenty20 International (T20I) appearance in 2006, Steyn has yet to take a five-wicket haul in the format. His best performance in T20I is 4 wickets for 9 runs, against the West Indies at the St George's Oval, in December 2007. As of 2015, he is joint eighth—with Harbhajan Singh—overall among all-time combined five-wicket haul takers.

Key

Tests

One Day Internationals

References

External links
 
 
 
 

South African cricket lists
Steyn, Dale